Wecker is a German word meaning "alarm clock" and may refer to:

People
 Wecker (surname)

Places
 Wecker, Luxembourg

Media 
 Der Wecker, a Yiddish newspaper of 1896
 Baltimore Wecker, a German-language newspaper of the 19th century
 Jikuu Keisatsu Wecker, a Japanese tokusatsu DVD/television series

See also
Weka